"c.o.s.m.o.s" is Japanese voice actress and singer Maaya Uchida's 6th single, released on October 25, 2017.

Track listings

Charts

Album

References

2017 singles
2017 songs
J-pop songs
Japanese-language songs
Pony Canyon singles